Afo Dodoo (born 23 November 1973) is a Ghanaian former footballer who played at both professional and international levels as a defender.

Career

Club career
Dodoo began his career in Ghana with Ashanti Gold, before moving to Greece in 1995 to play with Kalamata, He moved to Norway to play with Tromsø, making one cup appearance in May 1999, before ending his career in Sweden with Enköping and Landskrona.

International career
Dodoo earned a total of 23 caps for the Ghanaian national side between 1994 and 1996. He participated at the African Cup of Nations in 1994 and 1996, and made four appearances at the 1996 Olympics.

References

1973 births
Living people
Ghanaian footballers
Ghana international footballers
Kalamata F.C. players
Tromsø IL players
Landskrona BoIS players
Ghanaian expatriate footballers
1996 African Cup of Nations players
Expatriate footballers in Greece
Expatriate footballers in Norway
Ashanti Gold SC players
Expatriate footballers in Sweden
Ghanaian expatriate sportspeople in Sweden
Allsvenskan players
Eliteserien players
Ghanaian expatriate sportspeople in Norway
Association football defenders
Olympic footballers of Ghana
Footballers at the 1996 Summer Olympics